Urophora variabilis is a species of tephritid or fruit flies in the genus Urophora of the family Tephritidae.

Distribution
Moldova, Ukraine, South Russia (Caucasus), Georgia, Turkmenistan.

References

Urophora
Insects described in 1869
Diptera of Europe